Branden Alexander Kline (born September 29, 1991) is an American former professional baseball pitcher. He played in Major League Baseball (MLB) for the Baltimore Orioles in 2019 and 2020.

Amateur career
Kline attended Governor Thomas Johnson High School in Frederick, Maryland. In his senior year, in 2009, he experienced an increase in velocity, reaching , which drew attention from scouts. He finished his senior year with a 6–1 win–loss record, a 0.51 earned run average (ERA) and 79 strikeouts in 41 innings pitched. The Boston Red Sox selected Kline in the sixth round, with the 198th overall selection, of the 2009 MLB draft. He opted not to sign, as he had already committed to attend the University of Virginia on a college baseball scholarship.

With the Virginia Cavaliers baseball team, Kline was used as a relief pitcher in his freshman and sophomore years. In his sophomore year, Kline recorded 18 saves, the third most in college baseball, and tying the Cavaliers' record and setting an Atlantic Coast Conference record. That year, he was also named a first-team All-American. As a junior, Kline had a 7–3 win–loss record, a 3.56 ERA, and 94 strikeouts in  innings, with 15 of his 16 appearances as a starting pitcher.

Professional career
The Baltimore Orioles selected Kline in the second round, with the 65th overall selection, of the 2012 MLB draft. He signed with the Orioles, receiving a signing bonus just below $800,000. He made his professional debut after signing with the Aberdeen IronBirds of the Class A-Short Season New York–Penn League, where he compiled a 4.50 ERA in 12 innings.

Kline pitched for the Delmarva Shorebirds of the Class A South Atlantic League in 2013 where he was 1–2 with a 5.86 ERA in seven starts. He began the 2014 season with the Frederick Keys of the Class A-Advanced Carolina League, and was named their Opening Day starting pitcher. In August, the Orioles promoted Kline to the Bowie Baysox of the Class AA Eastern League. In 26 starts between both teams, he was 8–8 with a 4.08 ERA. Kline spent the 2015 season with Bowie. In eight starts, he pitched to a 3–3 record and a 3.66 ERA.

In October 2015, Kline underwent Tommy John surgery. He missed the 2016 season, and had a follow-up surgery in March 2017, forcing him to miss all of that season as well. He returned to Frederick in 2018 as a relief pitcher. The Orioles added him to their 40-man roster after the season.

He opened the 2019 season with the Triple-A Norfolk Tides. On April 20, he was recalled to the major league roster for the first time, as the 26th man for a double-header versus the Minnesota Twins. He made his debut that night, recording two innings in relief.

Kline was designated for assignment by the Orioles on January 30, 2020, and outrighted on February 5. On September 4, 2020, Kline was selected back to the major leagues. Kline pitched to a 1.80 ERA with 7 strikeouts over 3 appearances for the Orioles in 2020. He elected free agency on October 29, 2020.

On January 13, 2021, Kline announced his retirement from professional baseball via Instagram.

References

External links

1991 births
Living people
Sportspeople from Frederick, Maryland
Baseball players from Maryland
Major League Baseball pitchers
Baltimore Orioles players
Virginia Cavaliers baseball players
Aberdeen IronBirds players
Delmarva Shorebirds players
Frederick Keys players
Bowie Baysox players
Norfolk Tides players
Surprise Saguaros players